Yoann Chauvière (born  16 April 1987) is a professional ice hockey Centre currently playing for Dauphins d'Épinal of the Ligue Magnus.

Career
Chauvière made his professional debut with Avalanche du Mont-Blanc, a team he played for between 2005 and 2007. In 2008 he joined LHC Les Lions. In 2009, he signed with Montpellier Vipers.  In 2012, he signed with Épinal.

Chauvière has twice been a member of championship teams: the 2005 D3 championship team from Mont Blanc and the 2007 Espoir championship in Mont Blanc.

Playing style
Chauvière plays left-handed.

References

External links

French ice hockey centres
1987 births
Living people
Dauphins d'Épinal players